Sheng Lihao (born 4 December 2004) is a Chinese sport shooter. He won the Silver medal at the 2020 Summer Olympics in the Men's 10 metre air rifle event.

References

2004 births
Living people
Chinese male sport shooters
Olympic shooters of China
Olympic silver medalists for China
Medalists at the 2020 Summer Olympics
Olympic medalists in shooting
Shooters at the 2020 Summer Olympics
21st-century Chinese people